Swimming was contested at the 1990 Asian Games in National Olympics Sports Center, Beijing, China from September 23 to September 28, 1990.

Medalists

Men

Women

Medal table

References 

 New Straits Times, September 24–29, 1990
 Sports 123: Asian Games

External links 
 Olympic Council of Asia

 
1990 Asian Games events
1990
Asian Games
1990 Asian Games